The men's discus throw events were held at the 2021 World Para Athletics European Championships in Bydgoszcz, Poland.

Medalists

See also
List of IPC world records in athletics

References

Discus throw
2021 in men's athletics
Discus throw at the World Para Athletics European Championships